The West Kirby television relay station (also commonly known as West Kirby transmitter) serves parts of West Kirby, Wirral, UK (national grid reference: SJ224862). It is a relay of the Winter Hill transmitter. As of 2009, the transmitter serves approximately 3,400 homes.

Details 
The relay station is located on a United Utilities bore hole site near Column Road, West Kirby. 
The relay was not an original VHF 405-line transmitter. For 625-line analogue services on UHF, the relay covered a geographical Winter Hill blind spot in the vicinity of West Kirby near the Dee estuary. Prior to switchover, analogue channels BBC One, BBC Two, ITV1 and Channel 4 were radiated from the site. Being a relay of Winter Hill, the transmitter is in the BBC North West and ITV Granada TV regions.

From 4 November 2009 some digital TV services started broadcasting from the transmitter.

The final digital switchover date was 2 December 2009, after which three digital multiplexes (known as Freeview Lite) were made available.

All TV transmissions from the West Kirby site are vertically polarised.

Transmitted services

Digital television

See also
Flint television relay station
Moel-y-Parc transmitting station
Storeton transmitting station
Winter Hill transmitting station

References

External links
West Kirby's entry at the mb21 transmitter gallery
Map showing location of West Kirby transmitter site and surrounding areas

Buildings and structures in the Metropolitan Borough of Wirral
Transmitter sites in England